Arlington is a station on the Port Authority of Allegheny County's light rail network, located in Castle Shannon, Pennsylvania. The street level stop is designed to serve a nearby commercial strip, providing access for local residents to businesses along Mt. Lebanon Boulevard. Nearby Cooke Drive is also lined with apartments, allowing local light rail access for residents of these dwellings.

References

External links 

Port Authority T Stations Listings
Station from Cooke Lane from Google Maps Street View

Port Authority of Allegheny County stations
Railway stations in the United States opened in 1987
Red Line (Pittsburgh)